In game theory an uncorrelated asymmetry is an arbitrary asymmetry in a game which is otherwise symmetrical.  The name 'uncorrelated asymmetry' is due to John Maynard Smith who called payoff relevant asymmetries in games with similar roles for each player 'correlated asymmetries' (note that any game with correlated asymmetries must also have uncorrelated asymmetries).  

The explanation of an uncorrelated asymmetry usually makes reference to "informational asymmetry".  Which may confuse some readers, since, games which may have uncorrelated asymmetries are still games of complete information .  What differs between the same game with and without an uncorrelated asymmetry is whether the players know which role they have been assigned.  If players in a symmetric game know whether they are Player 1, Player 2, etc. (or row vs. column player in a bimatrix game) then an uncorrelated asymmetry exists.  If the players do not know which player they are then no uncorrelated asymmetry exists.  The information asymmetry is that one player believes he is player 1 and the other believes he is player 2.  Therefore, "informational asymmetry" does not refer to knowledge in the sense of an information set in an extensive form game.

The concept of uncorrelated asymmetries is important in determining which Nash equilibria are evolutionarily stable strategies in discoordination games such as the game of chicken.  In these games the mixing Nash is the ESS if there is no uncorrelated asymmetry, and the pure conditional Nash equilibria are ESSes when there is an uncorrelated asymmetry.  

The usual applied example of an uncorrelated asymmetry is territory ownership in the hawk-dove game.  Even if the two players ("owner" and "intruder") have the same payoffs (i.e., the game is payoff symmetric), the territory owner will play Hawk, and the intruder Dove, in what is known as the 'Bourgeois strategy' (the reverse is also an ESS known as the 'anti-bourgeois strategy', but makes little biological sense).

See also
 The section on uncorrelated asymmetries in Game of chicken
 The section on discoordination games in Best response.

References
Maynard Smith, J (1982) Evolution and the Theory of Games Cambridge University Press. 

Game theory
Asymmetry